Arjan Beqaj (born 25 August 1975 in Prizren) is a former Albanian professional footballer who played as a goalkeeper. He is now the goalkeeping coach at Anorthosis Famagusta.

In a career spanning 19 years he played for seven clubs in four countries. He is also a former Albanian international, earning 43 caps from 1998 to 2011.

Club career

Early career
Beqaj began his profession career in Kosovo with local side Liria Prizren in 1992. He then moved to Tirana, Albania at the start of 1995 to attend university, where he was to play for Partizani Tirana. He played in Albania for two and a half years as he left in 1997 to join OFI Crete after being spotted playing for Albania U-21s.

Greece
He spent six seasons at OFI Crete where he played 129 league games for the Greek side and even scoring a goal in the 2000–01 season. Beqaj then signed for Ionikos where he made 83 league appearances in three seasons before ending his nine-year stint in Greece.

Anorthosis Famagusta
Beqaj was one of the most important players that helped Anorthosis reach the group stages of the UEFA Champions League for the first time in history in the 2008–09 season.

The team started their campaign in the first qualifying round where they faced Armenia's Pyunik. It was an easy task for Anorthosis who won both matches with Beqaj keeping two clean sheets. In the next round against Rapid Wien, Beqaj kept a clean-sheet in the first leg but was beaten three times in the second leg but nevertheless Anorthosis progressed 4–3 on aggregate.

Beqaj was named man of the match in the second leg of third qualifying round against Olympiacos, making several vital saves in a 1–0 narrow loss which was enough to clinch to qualification to group stage after a 3–0 win in the first leg. By doing so, Anorthosis made history by becoming the first Cypriot team to ever qualify for the Champions League group stages.

International career
Beqaj was born in Prizren, SFR Yugoslavia (in present-day Kosovo), but is an Albanian international and has become Albania's first choice goalkeeper since legendary Albanian goalkeeper Foto Strakosha, who retired from both club and international football in early 2005.

Career statistics

Club
Source:

International
Source:

Honours

Club
Partizani Tirana
Albanian Cup: 1996-97

Anorthosis Famagusta
Cypriot First Division: 2007-08
Cypriot Cup: 2006-07
LTV Super Cup: 2007

Individual
Albanian Footballer of the Year: 2008

References

External links
 
 

1975 births
Living people
Sportspeople from Prizren
Kosovo Albanians
Association football goalkeepers
Kosovan footballers
Albanian footballers
Albania international footballers
KF Liria players
FK Partizani Tirana players
OFI Crete F.C. players
Ionikos F.C. players
Anorthosis Famagusta F.C. players
Olympiakos Nicosia players
Ermis Aradippou FC players
Kategoria Superiore players
Super League Greece players
Cypriot First Division players
Albanian expatriate footballers
Expatriate footballers in Greece
Albanian expatriate sportspeople in Greece
Expatriate footballers in Cyprus
Albanian expatriate sportspeople in Cyprus